The 1721 Tabriz earthquake occurred on April 26, with an epicenter near the city of Tabriz, Iran. It leveled some three-quarters of the city, including many prominent mosques and schools in the city, and resulted in the deaths of tens of thousands of people. The total number of casualties caused by the earthquake is between 8,000 and 250,000; it was most likely approximately 80,000. At the time that it occurred, the earthquake was popularly interpreted as an omen of misfortune, or a demonstration of godly wrath. The destruction that the earthquake caused was a significant factor in the successful Ottoman takeover of Tabriz in 1725, as well as contributing to Tabriz's economic difficulties during that period. It also caused the destruction of some of the city's significant historical monuments. Accounts of the earthquake are often confused with descriptions of the 1727 Tabriz earthquake.

See also
 List of earthquakes in Iran
 List of historical earthquakes

References

Sources
 

Earthquakes in Iran
History of Tabriz
1721 earthquakes
1721 in Iran
1721 in Asia